The 1994–95 Northern Premier League season was the 27th in the history of the Northern Premier League, a football competition in England. Teams were divided into two divisions; the Premier and the First. It was known as the Unibond League for sponsorship reasons.

Premier Division 

The Premier Division featured three new teams:

 Guiseley promoted as champions of Division One
 Spennymoor United promoted as runners-up from Division One
 Witton Albion relegated from the Football Conference

League table

Results

Division One

Division One featured three new teams:
 Atherton Laburnum Rovers promoted as champions of the NWCFL Division One
 Blyth Spartans promoted as runners-up of the Northern League Division One
 Fleetwood relegated from the Premier Division

League table

Promotion and relegation 

In the twenty-seventh season of the Northern Premier League Marine should have been (as champions) automatically promoted to the Football Conference, but were not as they did not meet the Conference's requirements, so second placed Morecambe took their place. Whitley Bay and Horwich RMI were relegated to the First Division; these two clubs were replaced by readmitted Leek Town (returning from the Southern League), First Division winners Blyth Spartans and second placed Bamber Bridge. In the First Division Caernarfon Town left the League to join the League of Wales while Goole Town and Mossley left the League altogether at the end of the season; they were replaced by newly admitted Lincoln United and Bradford Park Avenue.

Cup Results
Challenge Cup:

Bamber Bridge bt. Bishop Auckland

President's Cup:

Lancaster City bt. Witton Albion

Northern Premier League Shield: Between Champions of NPL Premier Division and Winners of the Presidents Cup.

Marine bt. Lancaster City

References

External links 
 Northern Premier League Tables at RSSSF

Northern Premier League seasons
6